Rivanna is a census-designated place (CDP) in Albemarle County, Virginia, just east of Shadwell. The population as of the 2010 Census was 1,860. It consists mainly of the Glenmore gated community.

Demographics

References

Census-designated places in Albemarle County, Virginia
Census-designated places in Virginia